The first season of the reality television series Love & Hip Hop: Miami aired on VH1 from January 1, 2018 until March 19, 2018. The show was primarily filmed in Miami, Florida. It is executive produced by Mona Scott-Young and Stephanie R. Gayle and co-executive produced by Maricarmen Lopez for Monami Entertainment, Toby Barraud, Stefan Springman, Mala Chapple, David DiGangi, Rick de Oliveira, Gilda Brasch and Alissa Horowitz for Eastern TV, and Nina L. Diaz, Liz Fine and Vivian Gomez for VH1.

The series chronicles the lives of several women and men in the Miami area, involved in hip hop music. It consists of 12 episodes, including a two-part reunion special hosted by Nina Parker.

Production

On February 28, 2016, it was reported that potential spin-offs set in Miami and Houston were in pre-production and the producers were auditioning potential cast members. In April 2016, Trick Daddy and Trina confirmed their involvement in Love & Hip Hop: Miami, despite the latter turning down the offer years earlier. On April 20, 2017, after over a year of development hell, it was reported that the show's producers had been granted permission to start filming in South Florida.

On August 25, 2017, VH1 announced Love & Hip Hop: Miami would make its series premiere in January 2018. The series would star Trina, Trick Daddy, Afro-Latina singer Amara La Negra, Gunplay, Cuban-Venezuelan rapper Veronica Vega, party promoter Prince, Love & Hip Hop: Atlantas Shay Johnson and openly gay rapper Bobby Lytes, with stylist Jojo Zarur, Pleasure P, Baby Blue Whoaaaa, stripper-turned-rapper Miami Tip, producer Young Hollywood, DJ Michelle Pooch, Gunplay's girlfriend Keyara Stone, Trick Daddy's estranged wife Joy Young, JT Money's son Jeffrey White, stylist Malik Williams, Steph Lecor, Prince's girlfriend Liz Cifuentes, model Gabby Davis, socialite Chinese Kitty and her mother Chinese Nicky rounding out the supporting cast. Amara's mother Mami Ana and Jojo's mother Faride Nemer would appear in minor supporting roles, while Love & Hip Hop: New Yorks Juju C. and Love & Hip Hop: Atlantas Lil Scrappy would make special crossover appearances.

On August 27, 2017, MTV aired an exclusive sneak peek of the show during the 2017 MTV Video Music Awards. On October 30, 2017, VH1 confirmed January 1, 2018 as the show's start date. This was followed by a series of teasers, including a cypher video, directed by Flex God Daps and featuring Trina, Trick Daddy, Veronica, Bobby, Amara and Gunplay performing in their distinct musical styles. On December 18, 2017, VH1 released a 5 minute "super" trailer, followed by "meet the cast" interviews with cast members 
Trina, Trick Daddy, Gunplay, Amara La Negra, Bobby Lytes, Veronica Vega, Prince, Shay Johnson, Jojo Zarur and "Sacrifice Vs. Paradise", where the cast discuss Miami's economic divide.

Synopsis

Cast

Starring

 Trina (10 episodes)
 Prince (9 episodes)
 Amara La Negra (10 episodes)
 Gunplay (9 episodes)
 Veronica Vega (10 episodes)
 Bobby Lytes (9 episodes)
 Shay Johnson (12 episodes)
 Trick Daddy (9 episodes)

Also starring

 Young Hollywood (10 episodes)
 Mami Ana (3 episodes)
 Keyara Stone (9 episodes)
 Pleasure P (9 episodes)
 Miami Tip (9 episodes)
 Joy Young (8 episodes)
 Gabby Davis (7 episodes)
 Jeffrey White (8 episodes)
 Michelle Pooch (8 episodes)
 Malik Williams (8 episodes)
 Jojo Zarur (8 episodes)
 Liz Cifuentes (6 episodes)
 Steph Lecor (10 episodes)
 Juju C. (3 episodes)
 Lil Scrappy (3 episodes)
 Chinese Nicky (8 episodes)
 Chinese Kitty (8 episodes)
 Faride Nemer (5 episodes)
 Baby Blue Whoaaaa (8 episodes)

Spectacular and Slick 'Em of Pretty Ricky, Trina's assistant Alvin Kelly, stripper Skrawberry, Love & Hip Hop: Atlantas Dawn Heflin and Jojo's father Antonio Zarur appear as guest stars in several episodes. The show also features minor appearances from notable figures within the hip hop industry and Miami's social scene, including Simply Jess, DJ E-Feezy, Stefi Chacon, Fuego, Bryant McKinnie, Ace Hood, T-Pain, Brandon Marshall, Ricardo Louis, Kenyan Drake, Nathaniel Clyne, Irv Gotti, Rico Love, Supa Cindy, Polow Da Don, Rick Ross and Slim Thug.

Episodes

Webisodes

Check Yourself
Love & Hip Hop Miami: Check Yourself, which features the cast's reactions to each episode, was released weekly with every episode on digital platforms.

Bonus scenes
Deleted and extended scenes from the season's episodes were released weekly as bonus content on VH1's official website.

Messiness + Mimosas
On March 15, 2018, VH1 released Messiness + Mimosas, featuring Bobby Lytes and Miami Tip recapping the highlights of the reunion.

Music
Several cast members had their music featured on the show and released singles to coincide with the airing of the episodes.

References

External links

2018 American television seasons
Love & Hip Hop